The Ministry of Local Government (MOLG), is a cabinet-level government ministry of Uganda. It is responsible for the "creation, supervision and guidance of sustainable, efficient and effective service delivery in the decentralized system of governance. The ministry is responsible for the harmonization and support of all local government functions, to cause positive socio-economic transformation of Uganda". The ministry is headed by a cabinet minister, currently Tom Butime.

Location
The headquarters of the ministry are located on the 4th Floor of Workers House, on Pilkington Avenue, in the Central Division of Kampala, Uganda's capital and largest city. The coordinates of the ministry headquarters are 
0°18'49.0"N, 32°34'57.0"E (Latitude:0.313611; Longitude:32.582500).

Subministries
The minister is assisted by a Minister of State, currently Jennifer Namuyangu.

Organisational structure
Administratively, the ministry is divided into the following directorates and departments.
 1. Directorate of Local Government Inspection
 Department of District Inspection
 Department of Urban Inspection

 2. Directorate of Local Government Administration
 Department of District Administration
 Department of Local Councils Development
 Department of Urban Administration
 Department of Finance and Administration

List of ministers
 Raphael Magyezi (14 December 2019 - present)
 Tom Butime (6 June 2016 - 14 December 2019)
 Adolf Mwesige (16 February 2009 - 6 June 2016)
 Tarsis Kabwegyere ( - 16 February 2009)

See also
Politics of Uganda
Cabinet of Uganda
Parliament of Uganda

References

External links
 Local Government Portal At Official Uganda Government Website

Science, Technology and Innovation

Government ministries of Uganda
Local government ministries